Diss Town Football Club is a football club based in Diss, Norfolk, England.

History
The club was established in 1888 following a suggestion from the local cricket club, with whom the football club initially shared the ground on Roydon Road. In 1892 they won their first trophy, the Norfolk Junior Cup, beating the Great Yarmouth Town second team in the final.

In 1906 Diss joined the Norwich and District League. In 1935 they moved up to the Norfolk & Suffolk League, and were runners-up in 1955–56. They won the league cup the following season, and again in 1960 (shared with Gothic) and 1961. In 1964 the club were founder members of the Anglian Combination, winning Division One in 1967–68 (also winning the league cup) and again in 1973–74. In 1975 Diss won the Norfolk Senior Cup, beating St Andrews 3–2 at Carrow Road. In 1975–76 they finished as league runners up and league cup winners. In 1976–77 they won the Premier Division, and won it again in 1978–79. In 1980 and 1982 the club won the league cup again.

During the 1983–84 season Diss moved to a new ground at Brewers Green Lane, and in 1988 became founder members of Division One of the Eastern Counties League. After finishing third, sixth and fourth, they won Division One in 1991–92 and were promoted to the Premier Division. In the same season, the club's reserve team won the Norfolk Junior Cup, a century after the first team had won it. Two seasons later the club won the FA Vase in front of a crowd of 13,450 at Wembley, beating Taunton Town 2–1 after extra time, following an injury time equaliser. The following season they finished as runners-up in the Premier Division and won the Norfolk Senior Cup again, beating Wroxham 4–0.

Under Robert Fleck the club won the Senior Cup for the third time in 2003, beating Great Yarmouth Town 4–1, and retained it the following season by beating Wroxham 3–0. In 2005 they reached the final for a third consecutive season, but lost on penalties to Wroxham. At the end of the 2006–07 season the club were relegated to Division One after finishing twentieth. They returned to the Premier Division after finishing third in 2010–11. They were relegated back to Division One at the end of the 2014–15 season.

Honours
FA Vase
Winners 1993–94
Eastern Counties League
Division One champions 1991–92
Norfolk & Suffolk League
League Cup winners 1956–57, 1959–60 (joint), 1960–61
Anglian Combination
Premier Division champions 1976–77, 1978–79
Division One champions 1967–68, 1973–74
League Cup winners 1967–68, 1975–76, 1979–80, 1981–82
Norfolk Senior Cup
Winners 1974–75, 1995–96, 2002–03, 2004–05
Norfolk Junior Cup
Winners 1892, 1992

Records
Best FA Cup performance: Second qualifying round, 1956–57, 1994–95, 2002–03
Best FA Vase performance: Winners 1993–94
Record attendance: 1,731 vs Atherton LR, FA Vase semi-final, 19 March 1994

See also
Diss Town F.C. players
Diss Town F.C. managers

References

External links
Official website

 
Football clubs in England
Football clubs in Norfolk
Association football clubs established in 1888
1888 establishments in England
Norfolk & Suffolk League
Anglian Combination
Eastern Counties Football League
Diss, Norfolk